Wojciech Szpankowski (born February 18, 1952 in Wapno) is the Saul Rosen Professor of Computer Science at Purdue University. He is known for his work in analytic combinatorics, analysis of algorithms and analytic information theory. He is the director of the NSF Science and Technology Center for Science of Information.

Biography
Szpankowski received his MS and PhD in Electrical Engineering and Computer Science from the Technical University of Gdańsk in 1970 and 1980 respectively.

Awards and honors
 Fellow of IEEE
 The Erskine Fellow
 Flajolet Lecture Prize

References

Living people
Polish computer scientists
Polish mathematicians
Theoretical computer scientists
Information theorists
Combinatorialists
Gdańsk University of Technology alumni
Purdue University faculty
Fellow Members of the IEEE
1952 births